Abby Damen (born 1992) is a New Zealand actress and writer. Damen is known for her roles in such television series as Girl vs. Boy, and Reservoir Hill.
She also won best actress in the 2014, 48 Hour Film Festival.

In 2015, Damen launched a recipe-sharing website called "Saving 2050", focusing on vegetarian recipes for environmentally-conscious people. The site promoted "animal-friendly" eating because Damen wanted to reduce her meat consumption after her diagnosis with endometriosis.

In 2017, Damen co-founded community dance classes Shut Up and Dance in Wellington, with Lesa MacLeod Whiting.

References

External links

1992 births
Living people
New Zealand television actresses
People with Endometriosis